Arthur Ernest D'Anvers (11 June 1898 – 10 June 1966) was a Belgian rower. He competed in the men's eight event at the 1924 Summer Olympics.

References

External links
 

1898 births
1966 deaths
Belgian male rowers
Olympic rowers of Belgium
Rowers at the 1924 Summer Olympics
Royal Club Nautique de Gand rowers